The 2021 Steakhouse Elite 200 was a NASCAR Xfinity Series race held on May 8, 2021. It was contested over 148 laps—extended from 147 laps due to an overtime finish—on the  egg-shaped oval. It was the ninth race of the 2021 NASCAR Xfinity Series season. JR Motorsports driver Justin Allgaier, collected his second win of the season.

Report

Background
Darlington Raceway is a race track built for NASCAR racing located near Darlington, South Carolina. It is nicknamed "The Lady in Black" and "The Track Too Tough to Tame" by many NASCAR fans and drivers and advertised as "A NASCAR Tradition." It is of a unique, somewhat egg-shaped design, an oval with the ends of very different configurations, a condition which supposedly arose from the proximity of one end of the track to a minnow pond the owner refused to relocate. This situation makes it very challenging for the crews to set up their cars' handling in a way that is effective at both ends.

Entry list 

 (R) denotes rookie driver.
 (i) denotes driver who is ineligible for series driver points.

Qualifying
A. J. Allmendinger was awarded the pole for the race as determined by competition-based formula. Jordan Anderson, Ronnie Bassett Jr., and Andy Lally did not have enough points to qualify for the race.

Starting Lineups

Race

Race results

Stage Results 
Stage One
Laps: 45

Stage Two
Laps: 45

Final Stage Results 

Laps: 57

Race statistics 

 Lead changes: 13 among 7 different drivers
 Cautions/Laps: 9 for 43
 Time of race: 2 hours, 2 minutes, and 51 seconds
 Average speed:

References 

NASCAR races at Darlington Raceway
2021 in sports in South Carolina
Steakhouse Elite 200
2021 NASCAR Xfinity Series